Bjerknes forces are translational forces on bubbles in a sound wave. The phenomenon is a type of acoustic radiation force. Primary Bjerknes forces are caused by an external sound field; secondary Bjerknes forces are between pairs of bubbles in the same sound field. They were first described by Vilhelm Bjerknes in his 1906 Fields of Force.

Theory 

The force on a small particle in a sound wave is given by:

where V is the volume of the particle, and P is the acoustic pressure gradient on the bubble.

Assuming a sinusoidal travelling wave, the time-averaged pressure gradient over a single acoustic cycle is zero, meaning a solid particle (with fixed volume) experiences no net force. However, because a bubble is compressible, the oscillating pressure field also causes its volume to change; for spherical bubbles this can be described by the Rayleigh-Plesset equation. This means the time-averaged product of the bubble volume and the pressure gradient can be non-zero over an acoustic cycle. Unlike acoustic radiation forces on incompressible particles, net forces can be generated in the absence of attenuation or reflection of the sound wave.

Bubbles with resonance frequency above the acoustic driving frequency travel up the pressure gradient, while those with a lower resonance frequency travel down the pressure gradient. In acoustic standing waves, small bubbles accumulate at pressure antinodes, whereas large bubble accumulate at pressure nodes.

References

Acoustics
Fluid dynamics

External links